Statistics of International Soccer League in season 1963.

League standings

Section I

Section II

Championship finals

First leg

Second leg 

West Ham United won 2–1 on aggregate.

American Challenge Cup
 FK Dukla Prague defeated West Ham United, 1–0 and 1–1, on goal aggregate.

References

International Soccer League seasons
International Soccer League, 1963